Steffen Weinhold (born 19 July 1986) is a German handball player for THW Kiel. In 2021 he announced the end of his time in the German national team.

Achievements
Summer Olympics:
: 2016
European Championship:
: 2016
  EHF Champions League:
: 2014, 2020
  EHF Cup:
: 2019
German Championship:
: 2015, 2020, 2021
DHB-Pokal:
: 2017, 2019, 2022
DHB-Supercup
: 2016, 2017, 2020, 2021, 2022

References

External links

1986 births
Living people
German male handball players
Sportspeople from Fürth
HSG Nordhorn-Lingen players
SG Flensburg-Handewitt players
THW Kiel players
Handball-Bundesliga players
Olympic handball players of Germany
Handball players at the 2016 Summer Olympics
Medalists at the 2016 Summer Olympics
Olympic bronze medalists for Germany
Olympic medalists in handball
Handball players at the 2020 Summer Olympics